Jonathan Crary is an art critic and essayist, and is Meyer Schapiro Professor of Modern Art and Theory at Columbia University. His first notable works were Techniques of the Observer: On Vision and Modernity in the 19th Century (1990), and Suspensions of Perception: Attention, Spectacle and Modern Culture (2000). He has published critical essays for over 30 Exhibition catalogues, mostly on contemporary art.  His style is often classified as observational mixed with scientific, and a dominant theme in his work is the role of the human eye.

Biography
Crary attended high school at the Putney School in Vermont. He graduated from Columbia College where he was an art history major. In 1987 he received his Ph.D from Columbia as well. Crary also earned a B.F.A. from the San Francisco Art Institute, where he studied film and photography.

He first taught at the Visual Arts Department at University of California, San Diego. In 1989 he began teaching at Columbia. He received a 1991 Guggenheim Fellowship.

Writing
Crary's 24/7: Late Capitalism and the End of Sleep explores the nonstop pace of the modern world and its effects on human psychology and physiology, with an emphasis on sleep patterns.

His Suspensions of Perception focuses on the period from about 1880 to 1905, exploring the second half of the nineteenth century in which a new way of seeing was introduced. Crary describes this shift as an emergence of subjective vision. In addition, Crary discusses how Attention became a “new object within the modernization of subjectivity...”. Crary's book examines how the perception of various cultures were reconstructed and uncertainties were argued. This new development of vision created controversy because it implied that seeing was dependent upon one's subjective thoughts, which were based on what the observer saw. Therefore, this new way of seeing was thought of as unclear, unreliable, and always questioned among a large population of people. Suspensions of Perception published in 2000 was the winner of the 2001 Lionel Trilling Book Award.

Crary's Techniques of the Observer gives a unique study on the origins of modern visual culture. Techniques of the Observer was published in 1990 and translated into twelve foreign languages.

Crary has also written on present day “art  and culture for publications including Art in America, Artforum, October, Assemblage, Cahiers du Cinéma, Film Comment, Grey Room, Domus and Village Voice.” Crary is also a critic and wrote critical essays for more than thirty exhibition catalogs. Crary has contributed to the Film Theory and Criticism anthology. eds Braudy & Cohen 7th edition.

Crary was one of the founders of Zone Books in 1986, which is a press known for publications in “History, art theory, politics, anthropology and philosophy". In addition, literature by Michel Foucault, Giorgio Agamben, Gilles Deleuze, and others are included. Crary was co-editor of the 1992 volume Incorporations (Zone Books). Today Crary continues to be a co-editor of Zone Books.

Bibliography

 Crary, Jonathan. Scorched Earth: Beyond the Digital Age to a Post-Capitalist World. London and New York: Verso, 2022. 
 Crary, Jonathan. 24/7: Late Capitalism and the Ends of Sleep. London and New York: Verso, 2013. 
 Crary, Jonathan. Suspensions of Perception: Attention, Spectacle and Modern Culture. Cambridge (Mass.): MIT, 2000. 
 Crary, Jonathan, and Sanford Kwinter. Incorporations. New York, NY: Zone, 1992.
 Crary, Jonathan. Techniques of the Observer: on Vision and Modernity in the Nineteenth Century. Cambridge, Massachusetts: MIT, 1990. 
 Crary, Jonathan. "Origins of Modern Visual Culture | Department of Art History | Columbia University." Visual Media Center | Columbia University in the City of New York. Web. 13 Apr. 2011.
 Crary, Jonathan. iDubai. Göttingen: Steidl, 2010. Photographs by Joel Sternfeld, text by Crary.  
 Virilio, Paul, and Jonathan Crary. The Aesthetics of Disappearance. Los Angeles, CA: Semiotext, 2009. 
 Barth, Uta. Uta Barth: The Long Now. Gregory R. Miller & Co. (July 31, 2010)

Notes

References
 Barth, Uta, and Jonathan Crary. Uta Barth, The Long Now. New York: Miller, 2010. Print.
 Cooke, Lynne, Karen J. Kelly, and Jonathan Crary. Robert Lehman Lectures on Contemporary Art. New York: DIA Art Foundation, 2004. Print.
 Riley, Bridget, Anne Montfort, Nadia Chalbi, Hélène Studievic, and Jonathan Crary. Bridget Riley Rétrospective: Musée D'art Moderne De La Ville De Paris, 12 Juin-14 Septembre 2008. London: Ridinghouse, 2008. Print.
 Lee, Ellen Wardwell., Jonathan Crary, and William M. Butler. Seurat at Gravelines the Last Landscapes. Indianapolis, IN: Indianapolis Museum of Art in Cooperation with Indiana UP, 1990. Print.
 Turner, J. M. W., Mark Francis, and Jonathan Crary. J.M.W. Turner: the Sun Is God. Liverpool: Tate Gallery, 2000. Print.

External links
 Jonathan Crary, Meyer Schapiro Professor of Modern Art and Theory, Columbia University

Living people
Columbia University faculty
Columbia College (New York) alumni
American art critics
San Francisco Art Institute alumni
The Putney School alumni
1951 births